University Hospitals Plymouth NHS Trust, formerly known as Plymouth Hospitals NHS Trust is the organisation which runs Derriford Hospital, and the co-located Royal Eye Infirmary (REI), as well as the Child Development Centre in Plymouth, Devon. The trust is an NHS trust that provides secondary health services in Plymouth and surrounding areas.

It is one of six centres used by the Defence Medical Services.

Trust
The trust runs Derriford Hospital, the Royal Eye Infirmary since 2013, and Plymouth's Child Development Centre. It also manages community midwifery services in Plymouth, runs clinics, and manages the Peninsula Radiology Academy.

It had planned to integrate with Livewell Southwest, a local social enterprise providing integrated health and social care services which was set up as a community interest company in 2011 as part of the Transforming Community Services initiative, however this integration was quietly cancelled following the discovery that continuing the integration would have been illegal.

In October 2018, the trust decided to move all its non-urgent orthopaedic surgery, about 200 cases a month, to the nearby Peninsula Treatment Centre, which is run by Care UK, in order to free up space at Derriford Hospital during the winter. In the winter of 2017, it was forced to fill an orthopaedic ward with medical emergency patients. The operations were still conducted by the trust's staff.  In July 2021 it planned to bring surgery for high-complexity patients back in-house. At that point 50 patients had waited more than two years for orthopaedic treatment at the trust, and 2,655 longer than a year. In August 2018 only 151 patients had waited longer than a year.  

The trust does not have an alongside midwifery led unit as recommended by the National Institute for Health and Care Excellence. It only offers services at patients’ homes and on its labour ward.

Performance

The trust has recorded a financial deficit each year since 2010 and expected to continue to do so for the next five years. The trust cancelled 648 operations at the last minute for non-clinical reasons between January and March 2015 - the highest number of any trust in England.

The trust has an arrangement with BMI Healthcare  for cardiac surgery performed by the trust's own surgeons at the London Independent Hospital. This is mainly valve replacements and coronary artery bypass grafts. Patients usually spend 5–8 days in hospital and are admitted the night before to take account of travelling.

The Northern, Eastern and Western Devon Clinical Commissioning Group gave the trust a £2.4million advance payment in November 2015 to help its cash balance. In February 2016, it was expecting a deficit of £36M for the year.

According to the British Orthopaedic Association, the Peninsula Trauma Centre at Derriford was the best in the country in 2016 for treating open fractures.

In the winter of 2019–20, the trust had severe problems in the A&E department with waiting times reaching eight hours (against the NHS target of four hours) repeatedly and the trust declaring an OPEL Level 4 major crisis.  In September 2021 Care Quality Commission inspectors found six patients being treated “on the floor” of the A&E department  while another was being assessed and triaged in a “storeroom” because the department was too small to meet the current levels of demand. The trust has secured funding to expand the department but progress is controlled by the government’s New Hospitals Programme.

See also
 Healthcare in Cornwall
 Healthcare in Devon
 List of hospitals in England
 List of NHS trusts

References

External links

University Hospitals Plymouth NHS Trust on NHS Choices 

Plymouth, Devon
NHS hospital trusts
Health in Devon
Health in Cornwall